The eighth season of Australian reality television series House Rules, also known as House Rules: High Stakes, began airing on 6 April 2020. The series is produced by the team who created the Seven reality show My Kitchen Rules. This season will be hosted by former judge Jamie Durie and Abbey Way.

Applications for Season 8 opened early in November 2018 and was confirmed in the seventh seasons grand final on the House Rules official network seven website. In July 2019, after seven seasons, Johanna Griggs announced she would not be returning as series host. In September 2019, Wendy Moore announced she would not be returning as series judge.

On 23 October 2019, the series was officially renewed for an eighth season which will be titled "House Rules: High Stakes" and for the first time will include eight teams, as well with the announcement of two new judges, interior designer Kyly Clarke and  home builder Saul Myers, Laurence Llewelyn-Bowen will retain his role as judge, however Jamie Durie will become the new series host, along with new co-host Abbey Gelmi.

It was announced in October 2020 that this would be the last season.

This season of House Rules consisted of new teams renovating each other's homes and further challenges for an ultimate prize of $100,000.

Format changes

Elimination rounds – This season will begin with eight teams. However, over two rounds, two teams will be eliminated. Each round will consist of renovating one half of a Gold Coast penthouse per round. The lowest scoring team from each round will be eliminated, whilst the other six will receive a spot in the competition.
Interior renovations:
Team scoring – For the first time during the interior renovation rounds, each team will also score each other's rooms, which will be combined into the average score from all teams.
Elimination – This is the first season to have a double elimination during interior renovations.
Round winners – The team who scores the highest after each house renovation receives $10,000 to keep personally.

Exterior renovations - For the first time, this season will not include any exterior or gardens renovations.
Grand final - for the first time, not the two but four remaining teams will fight it out in the grand final.

Contestant teams

Elimination history

Competition details

Elimination rounds: Gold Coast penthouse

Round 1

 Episode 1 to 3
 Airdate — 6 to 8 April
 Description — In the first of two eliminations challenges, the teams had to renovate a zone in the first half of a 1970s Gold Coast penthouse within 7 days. It was intended that the losing team in this challenge would be eliminated, but due to a team withdrawing from the competition during this round, there will be no elimination after the round is complete, however the highest scoring team will be fast tracked to the interior renovations.

Notes

Due to Carly & Andrew withdrawing from the competition, their two rooms had to be given to two teams, one room each, these rooms would now count as pass/fail rooms, if they pass the team receives 5 points, if they fail they receive nothing. The teams are:
Laith & George decided to take on the Master Bedroom. The room was judged as a fail and they did not receive 5 extra points.
Kayne & Aimee decided to take on the Open Study. The room was judged as a pass and they did receive 5 extra points.

Round 2

 Episode 4 to 6
 Airdate — 9 to 13 April
 Description — In the second of two eliminations challenges, the teams had to renovate a zone in The second half of a 1970s Gold Coast Penthouse within 7 days. The lowest scoring team at the end of this round will be eliminated.
previous winner's advantage: Tanya & Dave — fast tracked to interior renovation rounds
previous runners-up advantage: Kimmy & Rhi — allocating the zones to the teams

Interior Renovation
The six teams traveled around the country to completely renovate each other's home. Every week, one team handed over their house to their opponents for a complete interior transformation. A set of rules from the owners were given to the teams known as the 'House Rules' which needed to be followed to gain high scores from the judges and the homeowner team.

Victoria: Kayne & Aimee
 Episodes 7 to 9
 Airdate — 14 to 20 April
 Description — Teams headed to Kayne & Aimee's home in Cranbourne, Victoria for the first renovation. The highest scoring team will receive $10,000 to keep personally.

New South Wales: Laith & George

 Episodes 10 to 12
 Airdate — 21 to 27 April
 Description — Teams headed to Laith & George's home in Sydney, New South Wales for the second renovation. The highest scoring team will receive $10,000 to keep personally.
previous winner's advantage: Kimmy & Rhi — allocating the zones to the teams
Previous loser's disadvantage: Tanya & Dave — Camping in a tent during the renovation.

Western Australia: Tanya & Dave

 Episodes 13 to 15
 Airdate — 28 April to 4 May
 Description — Teams headed to Tanya & Dave's 's home in Perth, Western Australia for the third renovation. The highest scoring team will receive $10,000 to keep personally. Three of the bedrooms belong to their children; Luke, eight years old; Ben, six years old and Emily, four years old.
previous winner's advantage: Kimmy & Rhi — allocating the zones to the teams
Previous loser's disadvantage: Tamara & Rhys — Camping in a tent during the renovation.

Queensland: Tamara & Rhys

 Episodes 16 to 19
 Airdate — 5 to 11 May
 Description — Teams headed to Tamara & Rhys's home in Brisbane, Queensland for the fourth renovation. The highest scoring team will receive $10,000 to keep personally. 
previous winner's advantage: Kayne & Aimee — allocating the zones to the teams
Previous loser's disadvantage: Lenore & Bradley — Camping in a tent during the renovation.

Notes
Even though both Laith & George and Kimmy & Rhi received the same score, only one team could win this round, so the winner was decided by the scores given by the teams, Kimmy & Rhi received 8's from all teams however Laith & George received three 8's and a 9, meaning the 9 being the higher score they won this round.

New South Wales: Lenore & Bradley

 Episodes 20 to 23
 Airdate — 17 to 25 May
 Description — Teams headed to Lenore & Bradley's home in Greystanes, New South Wales for the fifth renovation. The highest scoring team will receive $10,000 to keep personally. 
previous winner's advantage: Laith & George — allocating the zones to the teams
Previous loser's disadvantage: Kayne & Aimee — Camping in a tent during the renovation.

Tasmania: Kimmy & Rhi

 Episodes 24 to 27
 Airdate — 26 May to 1 June
 Description — Teams headed to Kimmy & Rhi's home in Launceston, Tasmania for the sixth and final interior renovation. The highest scoring team will receive $10,000 to keep personally. The two lowest scoring teams overall will be eliminated.
previous winner's advantage: Tamara & Rhys — allocating the zones to the teams
Previous loser's disadvantage: Kayne & Aimee — Camping in a tent during the renovation.

Notes
Although Kimmy & Rhi were the highest scoring team in the previous week, they do not participate in the renovation of their own home, therefore the allocation of team zones was given to the second-highest scoring team.

Grand Final

 Episode 28 to 30
 Airdate — 2 to 7 June 
 Description — The four remaining teams will, for the first time in history, be renovating for charity. They have now been given only four days to construct a Nano-Homes freight house with no demolition required for a man named Lionel who has lost his home due to circumstances beyond his control. The winner at the end will be determined by points and will receive a grand prize of $100,000.
previous winner's advantage: Kimmy & Rhi — allocating their own zone

Ratings

 Colour key:
  – Highest number of viewers/nightly rank during the season
  – Lowest number of viewers/nightly rank during the season

Notes
Ratings data used is from OzTAM and represents the live and same day average viewership from the 5 largest Australian metropolitan centres (Sydney, Melbourne, Brisbane, Perth and Adelaide).

References

2020 Australian television seasons